Cirkidz is a youth circus school based in Bowden in the South Australian capital of Adelaide.

It was founded by Tony Hannan and Michael Lester in 1985 as a workshop project to provide alternative opportunities for recreation for disadvantaged young people in Adelaide's industrial inner-western suburbs. The initial 6-month project was so successful that it was continued, to the point where in 2015, Cirkidz celebrated its 30th anniversary.

Numerous Cirkidz alumni have gone on to careers in the circus arts at Circus Oz, NICA or by forming their own company (Rambutan Circus Collective, Gravity and Other Myths).

Cirkidz teaches circus and performance skills to children, young people, and adults through three core programs: Circus School, Performance Troupe and Community Workshops.

Circus School classes are available to anyone from 2 and a half through to 18 years old.  Adults can also attend to adults only classes. In these classes, skills are taught according to each student's age in a wide range of acrobatic arts, such as: Juggling, Unicycling, Stilts, Trapeze, Hula, Trampoline, Pyramids, Tissu, Barrel walking, Acrobatics, Skipping, Mini-Tramp, Flowersticks, Poi, Acrobatics, Cloud swing, Teeterboard, Clowning, Cord, Slapstick, Table sliding, Plate spinning, Cigar boxes, Globe, Manipulation, Slack Wire, Staff Twirling, Contact Juggling, Tumbling, Hoop diving and Fast Track; as well as movement, acting and related performance skills. They aim to provide meaningful recreation and community engagement opportunities for disadvantaged youth in Adelaide’s inner west.

The Performance Troupe are Cirkidz participants, and create high quality artistic work in the form of theatre & roving performances.  They are regularly booked to perform at a range of iconic South Australian events, including the Adelaide Fringe Parade, the Credit Union Christmas Pageant, the Tour Down Under as well as a range of other events. The Performance Troupe also have annual productions for the general viewing public. In 2009, they performed 'Freaky', a sold out co-production with Circus Monoxide as part of 2009 Come Out Youth Arts Festival. With an extensive production history, Cirkidz' most recent production was 'Nest' in 2013, in association with several local emerging visual and audio artists. The Performance Troupe's creative output is under the direction and guidance of Cirkidz' Artistic Director. Since 2012, Cirkidz' Artistic Director has been Joshua Hoare.

The Community Workshop Program takes the circus arts into schools, workplaces, health organisations, child care centres, or partners with events such as Tunarama in Pt Lincoln as part of Cirkidz brief to provide circus experiences for a range of disadvantaged, or isolated young people.

See also
Flying Fruit Fly Circus School
National Institute of Circus Arts

References

External links

Cirkidz
Circus in Australia at the Australian culture and recreation portal

Circuses
Circus schools
Education in Adelaide
Performing arts in Adelaide
Performing arts education in Australia